Honolulu House, also known as the Abner Pratt House, is a historic home in Marshall, Michigan, built in 1860 as a Hawaiian-inspired house with Italianate and Gothic Revival styles.

History
The house was built by Abner Pratt, a former chief justice of the Michigan Supreme Court and United States Consul to Hawaii under President James Buchanan. Pratt lived in the Hawaiian islands for many years, and after settling in Marshall, he began to recreate his former surroundings by building Honolulu House. The house was built across the street from a house that Pratt had built as a wedding gift for his daughter in 1841. The Honolulu house has a sprawling wraparound porch, reminiscent of the Hawaiian 'Iolani Palace. The walls were painted with tropical scenes.

Pratt died of pneumonia in 1863. The house was renovated in 1951 and was acquired in 1961 by the Marshall Historical Society for use as a museum.

Description
The Honolulu House is a two-story House clad in white vertical board and batten siding and sitting on a five-foot high sandstone foundation. The house measures 77 feet long by 37 feet deep. The front of the house has a deep, wide veranda supported by ornamental columns on sandstone piers. Massive triple brackets are atop each column, and ornamental wood tracery arches connect each pair of columns. The window locations are symmetrical, with large bay windows on each end of the house. Main floor windows are topped with wooden ornamental hoods. Above is a hipped roof, with four symmetrically placed chimneys, and a distinctive pagoda-roofed tower sitting above the main doorway and entrance stairs.

See also
 Oaklands Historic House Museum

References

External links
 Honolulu House - Marshall Historical Society

Houses on the National Register of Historic Places in Michigan
Michigan State Historic Sites
Houses in Calhoun County, Michigan
Museums in Calhoun County, Michigan
Historic house museums in Michigan
National Register of Historic Places in Calhoun County, Michigan
Historic district contributing properties in Michigan
Houses completed in 1860
1860 establishments in Michigan